Port Walter is located on the southeastern side of Baranof Island in Sitka City and Borough, Alaska. It is made up of two parts: Little Port Walter and Big Port Walter.

Little Port Walter was the home of a herring saltery during the turn on the century and the ruins can still be seen. Little Port Walter had a small community at one time but has been replaced by a research station that studies the life cycles of several species of Salmon. There is a staff of 3–15 state and federal employees running the research station year-round. There is a dock, and the harbor itself is a safe anchorage.

Climate
Little Port Walter has an oceanic climate (Köppen Cfb) that borders a subpolar oceanic climate (Cfc), with only four months having average temperatures above .

Demographics

Port Walter appeared once on the 1940 U.S. Census as an unincorporated village of 21 residents. This was actually referring to "Big Port Walter." It has not reported again on the census, and was later annexed into Sitka.

References

External links

Geography of Sitka, Alaska